Timothy Davies (born 26 August 1980) is a British (Welsh) judoka.

Davies won the bronze medal in the -66 kg category at the 2002 Commonwealth Games in Manchester.

References

1980 births
Living people
Welsh male judoka
Commonwealth Games bronze medallists for Wales
Commonwealth Games medallists in judo
Judoka at the 2002 Commonwealth Games
Place of birth missing (living people)
Medallists at the 2002 Commonwealth Games